The Paisley & District Amateur Football Association (PAFA) was a football (soccer) league competition for amateur clubs in the Paisley area of Scotland.  The association was affiliated to the Scottish Amateur Football Association.

The association was composed of three divisions.

League membership
In order to join the association, clubs must apply and are then voted in by current member clubs.

2014–15 league members

Premier Division
AFC Fubar
Apex
Arkleston Athletic
Elderslie
Fordbank Star
Gallowhill
Glenburn Athletic
Hazelwood
Linwood Thistle
Thorn Athletic

Division One (A)
Brucehill United
FC Renfrew Alba
G-Rock
Glencoats
Houston
Johnstone Thistle
Linwood Spartans
Tannahill
West End Athletic

Division One (B)
Boswell
Glasgow Deaf
Glentyan Thistle
Glenvale
Hillwood
Langcraigs
Shortroods
Stanley Athletic
Tannahill 'A'

External links
Paisley & District AFA League Website

Defunct football leagues in Scotland